The Intercambiador (aka Tenerife Transport Interchange) in Santa Cruz de Tenerife, the capital of Tenerife, combines the main station of the TITSA public bus service with light rail line 1, FerryBus and a parking for private vehicles. The station was opened on 17 June 2006.

It is located on Avenida Tres de Mayo in the centre of Santa Cruz. The facility is a major, six-level Park-and-Ride that with an area of 66,235 square metres.

There are 1,416 private vehicle spaces, and the Interchange accommodates nine million passengers a year, with approximately 3,500 daily bus arrivals and departures to all points of the island. It is also the point of departure for Line 1 of the Tenerife Tram, which covers the route between Santa Cruz and San Cristóbal de La Laguna.

In December 2011, the main concourse was closed off for some months when the ceiling collapsed.

Bus lines in the station

References

External links
 Web Page of public bus service of tenerife
 Web page of the tram service (Spanish)
 Web page of the Island Council of Tenerife
  Web page of the City Council of Santa Cruz de Tenerife

Buildings and structures in Tenerife
Transport in Tenerife